"V" Is for Vagina is the debut studio album by Maynard James Keenan's side project Puscifer, released on October 30, 2007. The album features a significantly different, electronic sound and arrangements than Keenan's other bands: the progressive Tool and alternative A Perfect Circle. Keenan himself compared the sound of "V" Is for Vagina to "driving around in your car listening to those old Motown hits, James Brown, and cool R&B stuff". "V" is for Vagina has sold 112,000 copies.

Release
The album was preceded by a non-album, retail-only single called "Cuntry Boner", released on October 2, 2007. Released a week later was an iTunes-only four track EP titled Don't Shoot the Messenger, with tracks previously released only on soundtracks.

On October 30, 2007, a second single, and first actual radio single from the album, "Queen B." was posted into a flash audio player on the official website, along with selected tracks by Keenan projects. On October 1, 2007, the video was posted on the Puscifer YouTube channel. The video features several fully CGI Maynards as pawns in a chess game between two women. The album debuted at number 25 on the Billboard 200, selling about 27,000 copies in its first week. On October 7, 2007, "Trekka (Sean Beaven Mix)" was published on Puscifer.com. And on October 25, 2007, the entire album was put up for listening.

On October 17, 2008, an official music video for the song Momma Sed was released online via the official Puscifer YouTube channel.

The vinyl edition of "V" is for Vagina was re-released in August 2016.

Remix album
On April 28, 2008, a remix album with versions of tracks from "V" Is for Vagina was released, entitled "V" Is for Viagra. The Remixes.

Track listing

Vinyl edition
Also on April 29, 2008, the album was released as a limited edition double vinyl album featuring two bonus tracks (which were also made available on the E-Deluxe Edition).

Side A:
 "Queen B." (M. Keenan, T. Alexander) – 3:56
 "DoZo" (Keenan, B. Lustmord) – 4:00
 "Lighten Up, Francis" (Keenan, T. Alexander) – 4:10

Side B:
 "Vagina Mine" (Keenan) – 5:35
 "Momma Sed" (Keenan, T. Commerford, B. Wilk, J. Polonsky) – 3:24
 "The Undertaker" (Spanish Fly Mix) – 3:44

Side C:
 "Drunk with Power" (Keenan, Lustmord) – 5:01
 "Trekka" (Keenan, Lustmord) – 4:46
 "Indigo Children" (Keenan) – 6:22

Side D:
 "The Undertaker" (Keenan, D. Lohner) – 4:00
 "Sour Grapes" (Keenan, Polonsky, Alexander) – 6:45
 "REV 22:20" (Dry Martini Mix) (Keenan, Lohner) – 5:08

Personnel
Performers
 Maynard James Keenan – acoustic guitar, percussion, drums, vocals, clarinet
 Joe Barresi – guitar
 Mat Mitchell – bass, guitar, programming
 Tim "Herb" Alexander – drums, drum engineering
 Jeremy Berman – percussion, drums
 Alessandro Cortini – synthesizer
 Ainjel Emme – guitar (acoustic), vocals
 Josh Eustis – guitar, programming, Wurlitzer
 Alain Johannes – guitar
 Gil Sharone – percussion, drums
 Rani Sharone – bass, guitar, percussion, fretless bass, guitar (baritone)
 Juliette Commagere – vocals (11)
 Trey Gunn – guitar, bass (12)
 Alfredo Nogueira – pedal steel
 Jonny Polonsky – piano, Clarinet, sampling, loops

Production
 Bob Ludwig – mastering
 Brian Lustmord – programming
 Eddie McClintock – artwork, design
 Lynn Sanchez McClintock – production director
 Alan Moulder – mixing
 Andy Savours – mixing

Charts

References

Puscifer albums
2007 debut albums
Sony BMG albums